David Haas (born June 23, 1968) is a Canadian former professional ice hockey player.

Playing career
As a youth, Haas played in the 1981 Quebec International Pee-Wee Hockey Tournament with the Toronto Marlboros minor ice hockey team from.

Drafted 105th overall by the Edmonton Oilers in the 1986 NHL Entry Draft, Haas played five games for the Oilers during the 1990–91 NHL season, scoring one goal.  His spent most of his tenure with their American Hockey League affiliate the Cape Breton Oilers.  He also played for the New Haven Nighthawks during 1991–92.  In 1993, he signed with the Calgary Flames as a free agent, but he would only play two further NHL games, scoring one goal and one assist, again spending most of his time at the minor pro leagues.

Europe
It was in 1994 where Haas began his European adventure, playing in Italy with HC Courmaosta where he stayed for one season.  After that he was off for Slovenia to play for Olimpija Ljubljana, where he spent three seasons and became a core player with the club, scoring 49 goals in the 1995–96 season and 85 points the next season.  After a brief return to Italy with HC Milano, his next stop was Germany's Deutsche Eishockey Liga where he spent five seasons with the Hannover Scorpions where he had a stellar career, frequently ranking as one of the team's top points scorer.

Retirement
After a brief return in America for the Fresno Falcons of the West Coast Hockey League, he spent one season in Hannover, though his numbers were less-productive compared to previous seasons.  David Haas officially retired in 2004.

Career statistics

References

External links

1968 births
Belleville Bulls players
Calgary Flames players
Canadian ice hockey left wingers
Cape Breton Oilers players
Detroit Vipers players
Edmonton Oilers draft picks
Edmonton Oilers players
Fresno Falcons players
Hannover Scorpions players
HDD Olimpija Ljubljana players
Ice hockey people from Toronto
Kitchener Rangers players
Living people
London Knights players
New Haven Nighthawks players
Phoenix Roadrunners (IHL) players
Saint John Flames players
Windsor Spitfires players
Worcester IceCats players
Canadian expatriate ice hockey players in Slovenia
Canadian expatriate ice hockey players in Germany